Margit Rüütel (born 4 September 1983) is a retired Estonian tennis player.

In her career, she won six singles titles and seven doubles titles on the ITF Circuit. On 12 January 2009, she reached her best singles ranking of world No. 158. On 9 April 2007, she peaked at No. 192 in the doubles rankings.

Rüütel made 42 appearances for the Estonia Fed Cup team between 1999 and 2012.
Playing in Fed Cup competition, Rüütel has a win–loss record of 20–22.

In 2012, she played her last match on the IZF Circuit, and retired from professional tennis 2015.

ITF Circuit finals

Singles: 12 (6 titles, 6 runner-ups)

Doubles: 12 (7 titles, 5 runner-ups)

References

External links
 
 
 

1983 births
Living people
Sportspeople from Tallinn
Estonian female tennis players
Universiade medalists in tennis
Universiade silver medalists for Estonia
Medalists at the 2007 Summer Universiade